The Polish–Soviet Friendship Society  was a Polish organisation founded in 1944. It was a vehicle for organized propaganda, like the celebration of anniversaries of the October Revolution, trips to the Soviet Union, exchange programs, promotion of Soviet culture, technology, books or movies as well as festivals of Soviet songs for amateurs.

Józef Wasowski was the first president of the TPPR. Up until the 1980s it had over 3 million members, mainly through pressuring students and government employees to enlist. In 1991, after the fall of the Soviet Union, the organisation was renamed to Stowarzyszenie Polska–Rosja (Polish-Russian Association).

Presidents of the TPPR
 1944-1945 Józef Wasowski
 1945-1950 Henryk Świątkowski
 1950-1952 Edward Ochab
 1952-1955 Józef Cyrankiewicz
 1955-1957 Stefan Ignar
 1957-1974 Czesław Wycech
 1974-1980 Jan Szydlak
 1980-1987 Stanisław Wroński
 1987-1991 Henryk Bednarski

In 1983, a committee on the 'brotherhood of arms' between the People's Republic of Poland and the Soviet Union was founded. The first head of this committee was Jan Śliwiński, replaced in 1987 by former NKVD agent Jan Raczkowski.

The TPPR issued a magazine called 'Friendship'.

Poland in World War II
Polish People's Republic
Socialist organisations in Poland
1944 establishments in Poland
Organizations established in 1944
Soviet Union friendship associations
Poland–Soviet Union relations
Stalinism in Poland